Meny Silva (born 22 February 2002) is a Cape Verdean footballer who formerly played as a forward for New England Revolution II in MLS Next Pro. He is currently without a club for the 2022-2023 season.

Career

New England Revolution II
Silva joined the New England Revolution academy in 2017, before signing a professional contract with the club's USL League One affiliate New England Revolution II on 21 January 2020. He made his professional debut on 7 August 2020, appearing as a 78th-minute substitute in a 2-0 loss to Orlando City B.

Personal
Silva was born in Praia, Cape Verde, before moving to Roxbury, Massachusetts in the United States when he was 11-years old.

References

External links
Meny Silva | New England Revolution

2002 births
Living people
MLS Next Pro players
New England Revolution II players
USL League One players
Cape Verdean footballers
Cape Verdean expatriate footballers
Association football forwards
Soccer players from Massachusetts